Jaromír, Jaromir, Jaroměr is a Slavic male given name.

Origin and meaning
Jaromír is a West Slavic given name composed of two stems jaro and mír.
The meaning is not definite:
Polish jary (archaic) = „spry, young, strong“; mir = „prestige, good reputation“
Upper Sorbian jara = „very“; měr = „peace“
old-Ruthenian jaro = „sun“; mir = „peace, world“

False etymology 
In the Czech, the name is seemingly composed from two other words. Word Jaro means „spring“ and word mír means „peace“.

Variations
 Jaroměr (Upper Sorbian)
 Jaromir (Polish)
 Jaromír (Czech, Slovak)

The female forms are Jaromira or Jaromíra. The short form is Jesko.

People known as Jaromir

Royalty
 Jaromir, Duke of Bohemia
 Jaromir (Bishop of Prague)

Others
 Jaromír Blažek, Czech football goalkeeper
 Jaromír Dragan, Slovak ice hockey player
 Karel Jaromír Erben, Czech writer
 Jaromír Funke, Czech photographer
 Jaromír Jágr, Czech ice hockey player
 Jaromír Ježek, Czech judoka
 Jaromír Kohlíček, Czech politician
 Jaromír Krejcar, Czech architect
 Jaromír Nohavica, Czech singer–songwriter
 Jaromír Paciorek, Czech football player
 Jaromír Štětina, Czech journalist and politician
 Jaromír Vejvoda, Czech composer
 Jaromír Weinberger, Czech American composer
 Jaromír Zápal, Czech illustrator

See also
 Little Mr Jaromir, a 2002 book by Martin Ebbertz
 Slavic names

Slavic masculine given names
Belarusian masculine given names
Czech masculine given names
Slovak masculine given names
Polish masculine given names
Ukrainian masculine given names
Masculine given names